The 1973 Calder Cup playoffs of the American Hockey League began on April 3, 1973. The eight teams that qualified played best-of-seven series for Division Semifinals and Finals. The division champions played a best-of-seven series for the Calder Cup.  The Calder Cup Final ended on May 15, 1973, with the Cincinnati Swords defeating the Nova Scotia Voyageurs four games to one to win the only Calder Cup in team history.

Playoff seeds
After the 1972–73 AHL regular season, the top three teams from each division qualified for the playoffs. The Cincinnati Swords finished the regular season with the best overall record.

Eastern Division
Nova Scotia Voyageurs - 101 points
Boston Braves - 81 points
Rochester Americans - 78 points
Providence Reds - 78 points

Western Division
Cincinnati Swords - 113 points
Hershey Bears - 95 points
Virginia Wings - 92 points
Richmond Robins - 70 points

Bracket

In each round, the team that earned more points during the regular season receives home ice advantage, meaning they receive the "extra" game on home-ice if the series reaches the maximum number of games. There is no set series format due to arena scheduling conflicts and travel considerations.

Division Semifinals 
Note: Home team is listed first.

Eastern Division

(1) Nova Scotia Voyageurs vs. (4) Providence Reds

(2) Boston Braves vs. (3) Rochester Americans

Western Division

(1) Cincinnati Swords vs. (4) Richmond Robins

(2) Hershey Bears vs. (3) Virginia Wings

Division Finals

Eastern Division

(1) Nova Scotia Voyageurs vs. (2) Boston Braves

Western Division

(1) Cincinnati Swords vs. (3) Virginia Wings

Calder Cup Final

(W1) Cincinnati Swords vs. (E1) Nova Scotia Voyageurs

See also
1972–73 AHL season
List of AHL seasons

References

Calder Cup
Calder Cup playoffs